Jay George Lamberson (August 27, 1846 – February 22, 1927) was an American politician and member of the Wisconsin State Assembly.

Biography
Lamberson was born on August 27, 1846, in what is now Elkhorn, Wisconsin. He moved with his parents in 1858 to Sextonville, Wisconsin. During the American Civil War, he served with the 6th Independent Battery Wisconsin Light Artillery of the Union Army. Jobs Lamberson held after returning home include schoolteacher before owning four near-by farms, including two dairy farms. He died on February 22, 1927, in Richland Center, Wisconsin.

On December 24, 1872, in Sextonville, Wisconsin, he married Jane Elizabeth Ward, a native of Paw Paw Township, DeKalb County, Illinois, and the daughter of Nathaniel Ward Jr., originally of Hampden, Maine, and Mary Came Bartlett, originally of Shapleigh.

His first surviving daughter, Mabel Z., married American physician Bertram Welton Sippy.

Political career
Lamberson was elected to the Assembly in 1890, 1892 and 1894. In addition, he was a member of the city council of Richland Center. He was a Republican.

Legacy 
After his death, a resolution in his honor was unanimously adopted by the Wisconsin State Assembly. It reads as follows:

References

External links

People from Elkhorn, Wisconsin
Republican Party members of the Wisconsin State Assembly
Wisconsin city council members
People of Wisconsin in the American Civil War
Union Army soldiers
Schoolteachers from Wisconsin
Farmers from Wisconsin
Dairy farmers
1846 births
1927 deaths
Burials in Wisconsin
People from Richland County, Wisconsin